Habib Jalib (24 March 1928 - 12 March 1993; Urdu,) was a Pakistani revolutionary poet, left-wing activist who opposed martial law, authoritarianism and state oppression. Pakistani poet Faiz Ahmed Faiz said that he was the poet of the masses. He opposed military coups and administrators and was duly jailed several times.

Early life
Habib Jalib was born as Habib Ahmad on 24 March 1928 in a village near Hoshiarpur, Punjab, British India. He migrated to Pakistan after the partition of India. Later he worked as a proofreader for Daily Imroze of Karachi. He was a progressive writer and soon started to grab the audience with his enthusiastic recitation of poetry. He wrote in plain language, adopted a simple style and addressed common people and issues. But the conviction behind his words, the music of his voice and his emotional energy coupled with the sensitivity of the socio-political context is what stirred the audience.

Political views
Criticizing those who supported Ayub Khan's regime, he wrote:

Kahin gas ka dhuan hae
kahin golion ki baarish
Shab-e-ehd-e-kum nigahi
tujhay kis tarah sarahein

There is smoke of teargas in the air
and the bullets are raining all around
How can I praise thee
the night of the period of shortsightedness 

Jalib could never reconcile with the dictatorship of Ayub Khan. So when Ayub enforced his tailor-made constitution in the country in 1962, which a former prime minister Chaudhry Muhammad Ali likened to the Clock Tower of Lyallpur, Jalib wrote the following poem:

Habib Jalib's poems used in Pakistani films

In another incident which has become a part of the resistance folklore of the country, the Governor of West Pakistan, the Nawab of Kalabagh, invited filmstar Neelo to dance in front of Shah Reza Pahlavi of Iran. She refused and as a consequence the police was sent to force and bring her, which led to her attempting to commit suicide. This incident inspired a poem by Jalib, which was later included by Neelo's husband Riaz Shahid in the film Zarqa (1969). The poem was titled Raqs-e-Zanjeer (The dance of the chains):

Tu kay nawaqif-e-aadab-e-ghulami hae abhi
Raqs zanjeer pehan kar bhi kiya jata hai.

You are not aware of the protocol of a king's court. Sometimes one has to dance (before them) with the chains on oneself.

The above Nazm/Song was included in film producer Riaz Shahid's film Zarqa (1969) in Mehdi Hassan's vocals which became a super-hit film song among the public in 1969 in Pakistan.
 " Zulm Rahay Aur Amn Bhi Ho, Kaya Mumkin Hai Tum Hi Kaho" Sung by both Noor Jehan and Mehdi Hassan in film Yeh Aman (1971), lyrics by Habib Jalib and music by A. Hameed. This film song also became very popular.

Bhutto's government
In 1972 Zulfiqar Ali Bhutto came to power in Pakistan after the 1971 war with India and a new independent country called Bangladesh emerged from former East Pakistan. Zulfiqar Ali Bhutto came to power in former West Pakistan, thereafter called simply Pakistan.

After Bhutto's death, Habib Jalib wrote the following poem:

His magic has not been broken
His blood became a slogan
It has been proved, that he ruled his people's hearts
He used to fight with the people like him (Feudal Lords), but with the (poor) people like us, he used to love.

Zia-ul-Haq's martial law
During General Zia-ul-Haq's dictatorship, Jalib wrote a poem on Zia, in which he asked how he could write darkness as Zia ( Zia literally means light in Urdu).

Darkness as light, Hot desert wind as a morning breeze
How can I write a human as God?

Benazir Bhutto's government
After General Zia-ul-Haq's death in 1988, Benazir Bhutto came to power and released Habib Jalib. Disappointed at the state of the nation, when asked if he felt any change after democracy, he said:

Haal ab tak wahi hain faqiroan kay
Din phiray hain faqat waziroan kay
her Bilawal hai Dais ka maqrooz
paoon nangay hain Benazeeroan kay

The status of the poor is still the same
the days of the ministers have indeed changed
every Bilawal (name of the only son of Benazir Bhutto) of the country is under debt
while Benazirs (i.e the poor) of the country walk without shoes

Death
Habib Jalib died on 12 March 1993 and was laid to rest in Shah Fareed Graveyard, Sabzazar, Lahore.

Poetry

Some poems in his own voice
 ظلمت کو ضیا Zulmat Ko Zia
 قائدِ اعظم دیکھ رہے ہو اپنا پاکستان Quaid-e-Azam Dek Rahe Ho Apna Pakistan
 فرنگی کا جو میں دربان ہوتا Farangi Ka Jo May Darban Hota
 مزارے لغارے Mazaaray Laghaaray
  وطن کو کچھ نہیں خطرہ Wathan Ko Kuch Nahi Khathra
  یہ منصف بھی تو قیدی ہیں Ye Munsif Bhi Tho Qaidi Hain
   گل سن Gal Sun (Punjabi)
اس قانون سے نفرت ہے عداوت ہے مجھے "ise qanoon se nafrat adawat hain mujhe"
 میں نے اس سے یہ کہا Mein Ne Uss Se Yeh Kaha
 دستور – میں نہیں مانتا Dastoor (Main Nahi Manta)
 جن تھا یا ریفرنڈم تھا Jin Tha Ya Referendum Tha

Recent tributes

Laal band remastered and remixed the revolutionary poem "Dastoor" in Habib Jalib's voice and included it in their 2009 album Umeed-e-Sahar.

On 23 March 2009, President of Pakistan awarded the highest civil award (posthumously) to the legendary poet, which was received by his daughter, Tahira Habib Jalib.

See also
Faiz Ahmed Faiz
Communist Party of Pakistan
Ahmed Faraz
Mir Gul Khan Naseer
Ustad Daman

Books
 Sir-e-Maqtal2
 Zikr Behte Khoon Ka Gumbad-e-Bedar Kulyaat e Habib Jalib Is Shehar-e-Kharabi Main Goshay Main Qafas K Harf-e-Haqq Harf-e-Sar-e-Daar Ehad-e-Sitam''

References

External links
Habib Jalib bio at WhoIsWho Pakistan

Habib Jalib at Kavita Kosh (Hindi font)
A collection of some of Jalib's poems
Habib Jalib: Some of his Punjabi Poems on Academy of the Punjab in North America (APNA) website

1928 births
1993 deaths
Punjabi people
People from Hoshiarpur
Poets from Lahore
Pakistani Marxists
Pakistani poets
Pakistani songwriters
Pakistani lyricists
Pakistani prisoners and detainees
Pakistani activists
Urdu-language poets from Pakistan
Nigar Award winners
Communism in Pakistan
Communist writers
Pakistani Communist poets
Communist Party of Pakistan politicians
Writers from Lahore
20th-century poets